All Good may refer to:

 "All Good?", a 2000 song by De La Soul
 All Good (album), a 2013 album by Nina
 All Good Music Festival

See also
 All the Good, a Thoroughbred racehorse